Lewis Taylor is a British musician. 

Lewis Taylor may also refer to
Lewis Taylor (album), album by Lewis Taylor
Lewis Taylor (rugby league), rugby league footballer
Lewis Taylor (rugby league, born 1997), English rugby league footballer who has played for the Hemel Stags, the Sheffield Eagles and the Coventry Bears (loan) in the 2010s and 2020s
Lewis Taylor (Australian footballer) (born 1995), Australian rules football player for the Sydney Swans